With Friends from the Orchestra is an album by the English progressive rock band Marillion. It was released on 29 November 2019 through earMUSIC and Intact Records. The album consists of orchestral re-recordings of songs from the band's catalogue, spanning Seasons End (1989) to Sounds That Can't Be Made (2012). Recording took place at the Racket Club (the band's own studio) and Peter Gabriel's Real World Studios. Strings were provided by the In Praise of Folly String Quartet, and string arrangements were written by Michael Hunter, who also co-produced the album with the band. The release is the band's second album of re-recordings, after Less Is More (2009).

Track listing

"This Strange Engine" has an additional line of lyrics, which was left off during the original recording in 1997.

Personnel

Steve Hogarth – lead vocals
Steve Rothery – guitar
Mark Kelly – keyboards
Pete Trewavas – bass guitar, additional vocals
Ian Mosley – drums
In Praise of Folly String Quartet
Nicole Miller
Margaret Hermant
Annemie Osborne
Maia Frankowski
Sam Morris – french horn
Emma Halnan – flute
Phil Todd – saxophone

Charts

References

Marillion albums
2019 albums